The Mentakab railway station is a Malaysian train station stationed at and named after the town of Mentakab, Temerloh District, Pahang. This station also serve to town of Temerloh, Bentong and Genting Highlands as the nearest station from these places.

The station is one of the major railway stations of Keretapi Tanah Melayu's East Coast Line. KTM intercity and express trains stop at this station. It will also be one of the stations of a proposed railway line, East Coast Rail Link in the future.

Train services
 Ekspres Rakyat Timuran 26/27 Tumpat–JB Sentral
 Ekspres Makmur Kuala 34/35 Kuala Lipis–Gemas

References

External links

 Mentakab KTM Railway Station

KTM East Coast Line stations
Railway stations in Pahang
Temerloh District